Urara Matsubayashi  (born March 13, 1993）is a Japanese actress.

Early life and education
Matsubayashi was born in Ōta ward, Tokyo, in 1993. She attended Showa Women's University and graduated with a degree in history and culture in 2015. Her first film was 1+1=11 while she was a college freshman.

Filmography
1+1=11 (2012)
Birthday Card (2016)
The Hungry Lion (2017)
21st Century Girl (2019)
Kamata Prelude (2020)
Love Mooning (2021)
Saga Saga (2023)

References

External links

21st-century Japanese actresses
Living people
People from Ōta, Tokyo
Actresses from Tokyo
Japanese film actresses
1993 births